Roadgames: Original Soundtrack Recording is the soundtrack album from the 1981 Australian film of Roadgames.

Album Information 
This CD features music by the composer  Brian May for Richard Franklin and Everett De Roche’s films Roadgames and Patrick.

Track List
Roadgames1. Main Title / On the Road / The Icebox / It’s the End of the World / No More Games2. Hitch’s theme / Morning Scene3. The Chase4. Quid Investigates / What’s the Matter, Buddy?”5. Quid Inspects Meat6. Hallucinating7. Final Pursuit8. Collision / High Jump9. Closing Titles10. Hitch's theme

Patrick11. Main Title12. Matricide13. The Flat14. The Intruder15. Room 1516. You Can Feel17. Bossa for Ed18. Kathy's tune19. The Trance20. Patrick Power21. Kathy's theme22. The Strobe23. Exit Matron24. Kathy Looks for Ed25. Dr Roget26. The Needle27. Kathy Returns28. I'm Going Now29. He's Dead30. End Title

Credits 
Engineer - Roger SavageSoundtrack album producer Philip PowersArtwork - Alex CottonMastering - Meredith BrooksBooklet Notes - Richard Franklin, Director of Patrick and Roadgames

References

1992 soundtrack albums